The Kamber Darbar is a Sikh shrine in Mumbai, India.

Founded in 1887, the darbar primarily houses the Samadhis of the Gurus Sai Vilayatrai, Sai Jiwatsingh, and Sai Vishindas,

Diwali Mela 
Some "Bhagats"(group of singers) came and voluntarily gave programme of the Darbar in Kambar in 1887 during Diwali Mela. 

From then on Sain Jiwat Singh concluded this to be the wish of Guru Wali Vilayvat rai and started to organise Mela during Diwali every year. This tradition is still being continued.

References

Sikh organisations
Organizations established in 1887